Alison Heydorn (born 5 December 1984) is a Canadian-born Guyanese international footballer. She played college soccer at Central Michigan.

International goals
Scores and results list Guyana's goal tally first

See also
List of Guyana women's international footballers

References

External links 
 

1984 births
Living people
Citizens of Guyana through descent
Guyanese women's footballers
Women's association football forwards
Central Michigan Chippewas women's soccer players
Guyana women's international footballers
Guyanese expatriate footballers
Guyanese expatriate sportspeople in the United States
Expatriate women's soccer players in the United States
Canadian women's soccer players
Canadian expatriate women's soccer players
Canadian expatriate sportspeople in the United States
Canadian sportspeople of Guyanese descent